Totally Tracked Down is a television reality documentary show created by, produced by, and starring Marshall Jay Kaplan. The show centers around Kaplan's search for celebrities from past sitcoms and dramas, usually through a chain of connections from directors and producers, to co-stars, to family members, and eventually the celebrity. The show was broadcast on TVtropolis from September 2, 2010 to November 25, 2010, running for 13 episodes.  It was also nominated for a Gemini Award in 2011 for Best General/Human Interest Series.

Development
Kaplan based his idea for the show on his monthly column "Where Are They Now?", where he researches celebrities based on reader's questions. His column was published in "some 40 monthly newspapers."  He pitched and sold the concept for Totally Tracked Down to TVTropolis, a Canadian specialty channel. Kaplan then partnered with Planetworks Inc., an award-winning production company.

Cara Stern of The Canadian Jewish News commented on Kaplan's searching process: "Kaplan tries to find out what various celebrities are really like through their connections, including people they know, places and things. Each connection introduces him to someone else, and the chain continues until he reaches the celebrity."

Production
Totally Tracked Down is co-created and produced by Planetworks Inc., a Toronto-based boutique production company. Executive producers and partners Carolyn Meland, Romano D'Andrea and Jeff Preyra have created and produced several award-winning lifestyle reality series, including Style by Jury, Brides of Beverly Hills, and Chef Off!.

Filming took place from April to June 2010, lasting over 50 days for 13 episodes.

Episode list

Reception
On December 2, 2010, Kaplan posted on Facebook that TVTropolis had changed their mandate and the show was not renewed, but "was consoled when his show was posthumously nominated for a Gemini Award" in 2011 for Best General/Human Interest Series.

References

External links
 

2010 Canadian television series debuts
2010 Canadian television series endings
2010s Canadian reality television series
English-language television shows